Pontinvrea is a comune (municipality) in the Province of Savona in the Italian region Liguria, located about  west of Genoa and about  northwest of Savona.

The municipality of Pontinvrea contains the frazioni (subdivisions, mainly villages and hamlets) Giovo Ligure and Ferriera.

Pontinvrea borders the following municipalities: Albisola Superiore, Cairo Montenotte, Giusvalla, Mioglia, Sassello, and Stella.

References

Cities and towns in Liguria